Brass Castle is an unincorporated community and census-designated place (CDP) located within Washington Township, in Warren County, New Jersey, United States. As of the 2010 United States Census, the CDP's population was 1,555.

Brass Castle is named for Jacob Brass, an early settler of the area.

Geography
According to the United States Census Bureau, Brass Castle had a total area of 2.934 square miles (7.599 km2), including 2.918 square miles (7.557 km2) of land and 0.016 square miles (0.041 km2) of water (0.54%).

Demographics

Census 2010

Census 2000
As of the 2000 United States Census there were 1,507 people, 517 households, and 436 families living in the CDP. The population density was 199.3/km2 (516.5/mi2). There were 535 housing units at an average density of 70.7/km2 (183.4/mi2). The racial makeup of the CDP was 98.21% White, 0.93% African American, 0.27% Asian, 0.46% from other races, and 0.13% from two or more races. Hispanic or Latino of any race were 1.66% of the population.

There were 517 households, out of which 42.4% had children under the age of 18 living with them, 75.2% were married couples living together, 6.6% had a female householder with no husband present, and 15.5% were non-families. 13.5% of all households were made up of individuals, and 7.9% had someone living alone who was 65 years of age or older. The average household size was 2.91 and the average family size was 3.18.

In the CDP the population was spread out, with 28.4% under the age of 18, 5.6% from 18 to 24, 28.4% from 25 to 44, 25.3% from 45 to 64, and 12.3% who were 65 years of age or older. The median age was 39 years. For every 100 females, there were 94.5 males. For every 100 females age 18 and over, there were 95.1 males.

The median income for a household in the CDP was $79,227, and the median income for a family was $84,783. Males had a median income of $51,689 versus $35,690 for females. The per capita income for the CDP was $32,393. About 5.1% of families and 4.3% of the population were below the poverty line, including 7.5% of those under age 18 and none of those age 65 or over.

References 

Census-designated places in Warren County, New Jersey
Washington Township, Warren County, New Jersey